Time Team Extra is a British television series that aired on Channel 4 in 1998. Presented by Robin Bush, it was a companion programme to the archaeology series Time Team, that first aired on Channel 4 in 1994.

Time Team Extra is an eight-part series, with each episode accompanying an episode of Time Team'''s fifth series. The episodes looked more into the history of the site being excavated.

Production
The location footage for the series was filmed across the UK and Ireland, including Hampton Court Palace, Jorvik Viking Centre, Stonehenge and Mellifont Abbey. The interviews with the guest were filmed at Hughenden Manor in Buckinghamshire, in the library of Benjamin Disraeli.

Episodes
Each episode of Time Team Extra is thirty minutes long and originally aired from 11 January to 8 March 1998 on Channel 4. In each episode, historian Robin Bush and a guest look back at the week before's Time Team episode. Time Team'''s fifth series aired from 4 January to 1 March 1998.

See also
 List of Time Team episodes
 Time Team Specials
 Time Team Others

References

External links 
 

1998 British television series debuts
1998 British television series endings
Channel 4 original programming
Time Team